Special Investigation or Special Investigations may refer to:

 Department of Special Investigation, a Thai security service
 Special Investigation Branch, the British armed forces military police CID
 Special Investigations Department (Brazil), a part of the Civil Police
 Special Investigation Group, a New Zealand governmental security group

See also 

 Special Criminal Investigation, a 1989 arcade game
 Special Investigations Unit (disambiguation)
 Special Investigations Bureau (disambiguation)
 Special Investigations Division (disambiguation)
 Office of Special Investigations (disambiguation)
 Special Investigations Section (disambiguation)